Samsung Wallet is a digital wallet platform developed by Samsung. It is available for the Samsung Galaxy-exclusive One UI Android operating system, and was announced on February 9, 2022, at the February 2022 Samsung Unpacked event.

History 
The "Samsung Wallet" brand name was first used for the company's mobile wallet system of the same name, which was introduced in 2013 before being migrated into a new app called Samsung Pay in 2015. Samsung Wallet now contains the Samsung Pay service for payment cards, alongside other features such as cryptocurrency assets and digital credentials. Although in South Korea both the service and the app are still known as Samsung Pay.

Features 
Samsung Wallet allows users to store items such as payment cards, loyalty cards, boarding passes, digital keys, and vaccination cards. It replaces the old Samsung Pay app on Android-powered Galaxy devices and is currently available in Australia, Bahrain, Brazil, Canada, China, Denmark, Finland, France, Germany, Hong Kong, India, Italy, Kazakhstan, Korea, Kuwait, Malaysia, Norway, Oman, Qatar, Singapore, South Africa, Spain, Sweden, Switzerland, Taiwan, Vietnam, UAE, the U.K. and the U.S.

Samsung Wallet also supports a variety of transit cards, such as T-money and cashbee in South Korea, as well as Octopus in Hong Kong. However, due to the region-specific nature of Samsung Wallet, users from other regions are not able to utilize these transit cards from their own devices.

Samsung also has announced that digital government ID and campus ID cards will be coming later to the app.

Ecosystem 

Samsung Wallet has a passes feature, which exists in a larger ecosystem. Passes are presented in the Menu tab of the app, or can be added to the Quick Access tab. Developers must first be granted access as a Samsung Wallet Partner to the Samsung Wallet Cards API before they can author such items.

An interaction (or transaction) between a pass and a system is facilitated by a 1D or 2D code, although it requires the customer to initiate the activity. Passes can also contain nothing but plain text or an image.

As of June 2022, Samsung Wallet supports memberships (loyalty cards), gift cards, health passes, and boarding passes. Memberships specifically also allow for users to create their own custom pass.

See also 
 Samsung Pay
 Apple Wallet
 Google Wallet
 Google Pay
 List of campus identifications in mobile wallets

References

External links 
 

Computer-related introductions in 2022
Mobile payments
Online payments